The Bismarck team was an integrated semi-professional baseball team based in Bismarck, North Dakota, in the 1930s. The team played independently of any league because its mixed-race roster was a problem in a period of segregation, and because there were no formal leagues at the semi-professional level in North Dakota in the 1930s. The team was owned by Neil Churchill, a local car dealer who owned the city's Chrysler dealership, and regularly played against Valley City, Jamestown, and other teams across North Dakota and Manitoba.

The club won the 1935 National Baseball Conference semi-pro baseball tournament in Wichita, Kansas.
Churchill raided other teams of their top players and stockpiled a team of Negro league and minor league all-stars. Hall of Fame Negro leaguers Satchel Paige and Hilton Smith led the team, along with Ted "Double Duty" Radcliffe and, of the white Sioux City Cowboys, Vernon "Moose" Johnson.

Although the club is erroneously recalled as the "Churchills" today, the team was not formally named in the 1930s, as North Dakota newspapers such as the Bismarck Tribune simply referred to the club as the "Bismarcks" in 1935.

References

McNary, Kyle P. 'North Dakota Whips Big Leagues',  Pitch Black Baseball (2001) Retrieved July 25, 2005.
Roper, Scott C.  1993.  "Another Chink in Jim Crow?  Race and Baseball on the Northern Plains, 1900-1935."  NINE:  A Journal of Baseball History and Social Policy Perspectives 2 (1) 75-89; reprinted in Bill Kirwin, editor, Out of the Shadows: African American Baseball from the Cuban Giants to Jackie Robinson (Lincoln: University of Nebraska Press, 2005) 81-93.
Roper, Scott C.  1994.  "A Summer in North Dakota:  Uncovering Satchel Paige's 1935 Season."  Baseball Research Journal 23, 51-54.
Roper, Stephanie Abbot.  1993.  "African Americans in North Dakota, 1800-1940."  Master's Thesis, Department of History, University of North Dakota, Grand Forks, ND.
Various 'Hall of Merit discussion:Ted Radcliffe', Baseball Think Factory (2005) Retrieved July 25, 2005.
Dunkel, Tom  2013. "Color Blind: The Forgotten Team That Broke Baseball's Color Line" (Atlantic Monthly Press)

Negro league baseball teams
Professional baseball teams in North Dakota
Sports in Bismarck, North Dakota
Defunct baseball teams in North Dakota
Baseball teams disestablished in 1936
Baseball teams established in 1930